Alfred Huber may refer to:
Alfred Huber (footballer) (1910–1986), German association football player
Alfred Huber (tennis) (1930–1972), Austrian tennis player